Maria Geraldine Smith (born 29 August 1961) is a former British Labour Party politician who was the Member of Parliament  for Morecambe and Lunesdale from 1997 to 2010.

Early life
She was educated at Morecambe High School and Lancaster and Morecambe College, where she gained a Diploma in Business Studies. Her first campaign was supported by the Communication Workers Union, for which she was formerly an officer. Prior to becoming taking office, she worked for the Royal Mail from 1980 to 1997, and was a member of Lancaster City Council.

Parliamentary career
After the Labour Party's poor showing in the local government elections of 4 May 2006 she was linked to a campaign on a timetable for Tony Blair's departure as Prime Minister and also expressed a preference for Gordon Brown to succeed him. She also found "outrageous" the survival of John Prescott as a government minister following the reshuffle.  She said that she believed William Hague would be the next Conservative Prime Minister, rather than David Cameron. In August 2009, she criticised the Human Fertilisation and Embryology Act 2008 which conferred legal parenthood on a biological mother's female partner, saying "To have a birth certificate with two mothers and no father is just madness." Smith was a member of the All-Party Parliamentary Flag Group.

On Wednesday 17 September 2008, Smith was interviewed by Tony Livesey on BBC Radio Lancashire's Breakfast Show; she attacked the so-called "Lancashire Mafia" for their plot against Prime Minister Gordon Brown, and accused those behind the scenes of being cowards.

Smith narrowly lost her seat to the Conservative David Morris in the general election in May 2010.

Personal life
Geraldine Smith is the Patron of the Morecambe Bay National Osteoporosis Society Support Group.

Geraldine Smith was the President of 455 (Morecambe and Heysham) Squadron Air Training Corps until 2010 when she regretfully to its members stood down after a number of years as an ambassador to youth development in the area.  The Air Training Corps is a youth organisation sponsored by the Royal Air Force for local youth between the ages of 13 and 18 giving them opportunities to learn new skills and support their local community.

References

External links
 The Labour Party – Geraldine Smith MP official biography
 Guardian Unlimited Politics – Ask Aristotle: Geraldine Smith MP
 TheyWorkForYou.com – Geraldine Smith MP
 BBC Politics page 

1961 births
Living people
Labour Party (UK) MPs for English constituencies
Female members of the Parliament of the United Kingdom for English constituencies
Councillors in Lancashire
Labour Party (UK) councillors
Members of the Parliament of the United Kingdom for constituencies in Lancashire
People from Morecambe
Politicians from Belfast
Royal Mail people
UK MPs 1997–2001
UK MPs 2001–2005
UK MPs 2005–2010
20th-century British women politicians
21st-century British women politicians
20th-century women politicians from Northern Ireland
20th-century people from Northern Ireland
21st-century women politicians from Northern Ireland
21st-century people from Northern Ireland
Women councillors in England